The 2022 1000 Miles of Sebring was an endurance sportscar racing event held on the 18 March 2022, as the opening round of the 2022 FIA World Endurance Championship. This was the second running of the race, a 268-lap event or 8 hours (whichever comes first), and the first time the event had been held since the 2019 1000 Miles of Sebring, after due to the 2020 and 2021 races being cancelled by the COVID-19 pandemic.

Background 

The provisional calendar for the 2022 FIA World Endurance Championship released in August 2021. It saw a few changes, with the return of the Sebring and Fuji races, whilst the Portimao and second Bahrain races were dropped.

Entry list 
The entry list was revealed on 9 March 2022.

Qualifying 
Pole position winners in each class are marked in bold.

Race 
The race was stopped twice during the course of the event with red flags. The first stoppage was after the crash of the #7 Toyota Gazoo Racing entry, which required extensive time for car recovery and barrier repair. The second stoppage occurred in the final hour due to lightning strikes and heavy rain showers in the area. The race was ultimately ended early due to the weather conditions.

Race Result 
The minimum number of laps for classification (70% of the overall winning car's distance) was 136 laps.

Standings after the race 

2022 Hypercar World Endurance Drivers' Championship

2022 Hypercar World Endurance Manufacturers' Championship 

2022 World Endurance GTE Drivers' Championship

2022 World Endurance GTE Manufacturers' Championship

 Note: Only the top five positions are included for the Drivers' Championship standings.

References 

Sebring
2022 in American motorsport
1000 Miles of Sebring
1000 Miles of Sebring